Matt Bishop (born 25 December 1962) is an English journalist, author, novelist and public relations executive. After leaving the Cardinal Vaughan Memorial School, Holland Park, in 1981, he failed to qualify as a London bus driver and then worked as a bookmaker, a betting-shop manager, and a minicab driver until the 1990s, when he began to freelance as a writer for Sporting Life and applied to university to study psychology. Dropping out after a year, he began his full-time writing career at Car magazine in 1993, becoming features editor, then in September 1995 moved to Focus magazine as deputy editor then acting editor, before joining F1 Racing (now renamed GP Racing) magazine as editor in December 1996, remaining until September 2007. F1 Racing sold 1.25 million copies a month worldwide during Bishop's tenure.

In the wake of the 2007 Formula 1 espionage controversy, which resulted in the McLaren Formula 1 team being fined an unprecedented $100 million, Bishop was recruited by McLaren chairman Ron Dennis to become the company's communications director. He left McLaren in July 2017. He wrote his first novel, The Boy Made the Difference (published in 2020), before returning to motorsport public relations work in 2018 as a member of the senior leadership team of W Series, the world’s first single-seater motor racing championship for female drivers only.

On 10 December 2020 it was announced that Bishop had been recruited by the Aston Martin Formula 1 team to be its chief communications officer, starting in 2021.

Personal life

Bishop is openly gay, has been a forthright speaker on LGBTQ+ issues for many years, and is a founder ambassador of Racing Pride, a movement developed with Stonewall and launched in June 2019, its aim to promote LGBTQ+ inclusivity in the motorsport industry. Bishop lives in London with his husband Angel Bautista, a chef and makeup artist.

Background and writing career

Bishop was born in London to Bernardine Bishop (1939-2013), an English novelist, teacher and psychotherapist, and the American classical concert pianist Stephen Kovacevich. A critically acclaimed author of five novels, one of them, Unexpected Lessons in Love, short-listed for the 2013 Costa Novel Award, Bernardine Bishop died of colon cancer in July 2013.

Matt Bishop’s grandmother was Barbara Lucas (née Wall, 1911-2009), an English journalist, author, novelist and peace campaigner. His great-great aunt was Viola Meynell (1885-1956), an English author, novelist and poet, and his great-great grandmother was Alice Meynell (1847-1922), an English author, poet and suffragist, whose husband was Wilfrid Meynell (1852-1948), an English author and editor.

Matt Bishop has worked as a voluntary fundraiser for the children’s cancer charity CLIC Sargent for many years, having been introduced to the charity in 2007 by ex-Formula 1 team principal Eddie Jordan. All proceeds from sales of The Boy Made the Difference, Bishop’s first novel, will go to CLIC Sargent.

Early in Bishop's tenure as editor of F1 Racing, the magazine achieved a notable scoop by exposing the 'brake-steer' system on the McLaren MP4/12, an innovation by which drivers could brake the rear wheels independently of the front, altering the car's handling characteristics to improve laptime. It was subsequently banned after protests from Ferrari. Bishop and photographer Darren Heath had observed in photographs that the McLarens' rear brake discs were glowing in the middle of corners, and arranged to surreptitiously photograph the inside of the cockpit via a plan in which Bishop tipped off Heath via phone if either of the cars broke down mid-race.

While editor-in-chief of F1 Racing, Bishop also wrote columns for Autosport and Autosport.com, entitled ‘Praise Be!’ And ‘From the Pulpit’.

The Boy Made the Difference, Bishop’s debut novel, takes as its subject matter the HIV/AIDS crisis of the late 1980s and early 1990s. A fictional tale about a family living in north-west London,  it draws on Bishop’s experiences of working as a home support volunteer, or ‘buddy’, for London Lighthouse, at that time the world’s largest HIV/AIDS centre.

Works

Non-fiction
Emmo: a Racer’s Soul (co-written with Emerson Fittipaldi, 2014)

Novels
The Boy Made the Difference (2020)

References

Writers from London
21st-century English novelists
Living people
British gay writers
English sports journalists
1962 births
British LGBT journalists
Formula One people
English motorsport people